A Interosseous ligament can refer to: 
 Dorsal intertarsal ligaments
 Interosseous ligaments of tarsus
 Bifurcated ligament
 Interosseous sacroiliac ligament
 Interosseous intercarpal ligaments
 Interosseous intercuneiform ligaments
 Interosseous metatarsal ligaments

It is sometimes used interchangeably with interosseous membrane.